The Men's giant slalom competition of the Sapporo 1972 Olympics was held at Teine on Wednesday, February 9, and Thursday, February 10.

The defending world champion was Karl Schranz of Austria, who was barred from competing in the Olympics. Italy's Gustav Thöni was the defending World Cup giant slalom co-champion (with France's Patrick Russel) and led the 1972 World Cup.

Results
Both of the runs started at 13:30 JST (UTC+9) under clear skies.

References 

Men's giant slalom
Winter Olympics
Men's giant slalom